James F. Doehring (born January 27, 1962 in Santa Barbara, California) is a former American athlete who primarily competed in the shot put.

In 1981, Doehring was the United States junior champion in shot put before being severely injured in a motorcycle accident. He recovered to earn a berth on the 1988 Summer Olympics team, finishing in eleventh place. In December 1990 Doehring tested positive for steroids and was given a two year suspension. He was reinstated in March 1992 due to "procedural improprieties" in the test. This allowed Doehring to compete for the United States in the 1992 Summer Olympics in Barcelona, Spain where he won the silver medal in the men's shot put. The U.S. finished first and second in the event for the first time since the 1968 Summer Olympics in Mexico City. At the 1993 IAAF World Indoor Championships, he again won the silver medal in the men's shot put.

References

1962 births
Living people
American sportspeople in doping cases
American male shot putters
Doping cases in athletics
Olympic silver medalists for the United States in track and field
Athletes (track and field) at the 1988 Summer Olympics
Athletes (track and field) at the 1992 Summer Olympics
Track and field athletes from California
Sportspeople from Santa Barbara, California
San Jose State University alumni
Medalists at the 1992 Summer Olympics
Goodwill Games medalists in athletics
Competitors at the 1990 Goodwill Games